Junior Philippine Institute of Industrial Engineers or JPIIE (former name: Society of Industrial Engineering) is an academic organization based in University of Perpetual Help System DALTA - Calamba Campus exclusive for BS Industrial Engineering students, faculty and alumni of the said university. It is one of the seven student organizations under the College of Engineering of the university which includes MES (Mechanical Engineering Society) for BS Mechanical Engineering students and ACES (Association of Civil Engineering Students) for BS Civil Engineering among others. The organization is also a member of PIIE (Philippine Institute of Industrial Engineers), a premier organization of BS Industrial Engineering graduates and students, and IE professionals in the Philippines. Engr. Philip Ermita, PIE, ASEAN Engr. is the organization's adviser aside from being the Dean of College of Engineering in the university.

History 
The society was first recognized by the University and its former school director Mr. Rey Dalde in August 2002 with the efforts of its first student officers for AY 2002-2003 being headed by the former president, Ms. Maria Fe dela Cruz.
The society's by-laws was written by Ms. Cherryl C. Marudo. According to the by-laws, the name of the organization is Society of Industrial Engineering Students (or SIES). But, for some reasons, it became locally known as SIE (without the second S which means Students) probably because its name structure has been compared to the university's College of Engineering.
By the year 2016, the SIE renamed as the Junior Philippine Institute of Industrial Engineers or JPIIE.

List of presidents of SIE

References

External links
 http://piie.org/
 https://web.archive.org/web/20110831233320/http://uphsdsie.webs.com/
 http://www.perpetualdalta.edu.ph

Engineering organizations
Organizations established in 2002
University of Perpetual Help System
2002 establishments in the Philippines